Spouses and partners of the president of France often play a protocol role at the Élysée Palace and during official visits, though they possess no official title. Brigitte Macron is the spouse of the current president, Emmanuel Macron, who took office on 14 May 2017.

List

Current living presidential spouses or partners 

See also 
 First Lady
 President of France

References 

 
France
Spouses of the President